Hovie Franklin Lister (September 17, 1926 – December 28, 2001) was an American gospel musician, Baptist Minister, and politician. Lister was best known for his time as the front man of the Statesmen Quartet, perhaps the most well known and renowned Southern Gospel quartet in the decades of the 1950s and 1960s, as well as one of the most respected groups of all time.

Biography
Lister was born in Greenville, South Carolina, and learned piano from the age of six. He accompanied a singing group composed of his father and three of his uncles (The Lister Brothers Quartet) at 14, and toured with Mordecai Ham at the same age. He attended the Stamps-Baxter School of Music in Dallas.

Following his education, Lister served as an accompanist for The Lefevres, The Homeland Harmony, and The Rangers Quartet in the 1940s. In 1948, he formed The Statesmen Quartet, and remained the group's anchor for decades. Lister's style, which differed from his predecessor's styles in its incorporation of jazz, soul and ragtime idioms over the staid, solemn accompaniment of prior generations, influenced the sound of gospel and CCM in the later 20th century. Lister remained a member of The Statesmen Quartet into the 2000s.

Aside from performing, Lister also had interests in music publishing and promotion. Lister was inducted into the Southern Gospel Hall of Fame in 1997.

References

External links

1926 births
2001 deaths
Gospel music pianists
Southern gospel performers
Politicians from Greenville, South Carolina
Musicians from Greenville, South Carolina
American music publishers (people)
20th-century American pianists
American male pianists
20th-century American male musicians